"Say It" is a song performed by American contemporary R&B group Voices of Theory, issued as the second single from their eponymous studio album. The song was their biggest hit on the Billboard Hot 100, peaking at #10 on the chart in 1998.

Chart positions

References

External links
 
 

1997 songs
1998 singles
PolyGram singles
Voices of Theory songs